The Tasmanian codling (Eeyorius hutchinsi)  is a species of morid cod only known from the waters around Tasmania and the Australian states of Western Australia and Victoria. This is the only known species in its genus.

Etymology 
The genus name Eeyorius is derived from the character Eeyore from A. A. Milne's Winnie the Pooh stories because Eeyore "lived in damp places".  The species epithet honors J. Barry Hutchins, an ichthyologist with the Western Australian Museum.

References
 

Moridae
Monotypic fish genera
Fish described in 1986